Dealu ("the hill") may refer to several places in Romania:

Dealu, a commune in Harghita County
Dealu, a village in Hârtiești Commune, Argeș County
Dealu, a village in Crevedia Mare Commune, Giurgiu County
Dealu, a village in Zvoriștea Commune, Suceava County
Dealu Monastery, near Târgovişte

additionally, several places in Romania end in "-Deal":

 Bolintin-Deal, a commune in Giurgiu County
 Bălteni-Deal, a village in Bălteni Commune, Vaslui County
 Bursuc-Deal, a village in Lespezi Commune, Iaşi County
 Cândeşti-Deal, a village in Cândești Commune, Dâmbovița County
 Cătămărești-Deal and Cervicești-Deal, villages in Mihai Eminescu Commune, Botoșani County
 Ciurari-Deal, a village in Gratia Commune, Teleorman County
 Copalnic-Deal, a village in Copalnic-Mănăştur Commune, Maramureș County
 Costeşti-Deal, a village in Orăştioara de Sus Commune, Hunedoara County
 Curseşti-Deal, a village in Pungeşti Commune, Vaslui County
 Dragomireşti-Deal, a village in Dragomireşti-Vale Commune, Ilfov County
 Dumbrava-Deal, a village in Săvineşti Commune, Neamţ County
 Frasin-Deal, a village in Cobia Commune, Dâmbovița County
 Glâmbocata-Deal, a village in Leordeni Commune, Argeș County
 Orășeni-Deal, a village in Curtești Commune, Botoșani County
 Pătroaia-Deal. a village in Crângurile Commune, Dâmbovița County
 Poieneşti-Deal, a village in Poieneşti Commune, Vaslui County
 Potlogeni-Deal, a village in Petrești Commune, Dâmbovița County
 Rădoieşti-Deal, a village in Rădoieşti Commune, Teleorman County
 Rânghilești-Deal, a village in Santa Mare Commune, Botoșani County
 Săliştea-Deal, a village in Săliştea Commune, Alba County
 Segarcea-Deal, a village in Segarcea-Vale Commune, Teleorman County
 Umbrăreşti-Deal, a village in Umbrăreşti Commune, Galați County
 Vlădeni-Deal, a village in Frumușica Commune, Botoșani County

See also 
 Deleni (disambiguation)
 Delureni (disambiguation)
 Deleanu (surname)